Scald Law is a hill in Midlothian, Scotland. At  it is the highest of the Pentland Hills. The hill is composed of Devonian volcanic rock.

Etymology
The origin of the name is uncertain. Some sources say it derives from the Scots Language word scawed, meaning "bare." Others suggest that it derived from the Old Norse word sgat (meaning "rent") as cattle were pastured on the hill on payment of a rent. A further explanation is that it derives from scaldberry, an old name for blackberry. The word law is derived from the Old English for hill.

References

External links

Mountains and hills of Midlothian
Hills of the Scottish Midland Valley
Volcanism of Scotland
Devonian volcanism
Marilyns of Scotland